Leucanopsis dallipa is a moth of the family Erebidae. It was described by E. Dukinfield Jones in 1908. It is found in Brazil and Paraguay.

References

 

dallipa
Moths described in 1908